The Zhongxing Grand Tiger is a series of mid-size pickup truck designed and developed by Hebei Zhongxing Automobile. The Zhongxing Grand Tiger was also sold in some markets such as Africa, South America, Caucasus, the Middle East, Russia and Eastern Europe.

Overview
Zhongxing revealed the Zhongxing Grand Tiger in the Chinese market based on the Zhongxing Weihu platform as the entry level model of the whole Zhongxing Grand Tiger series, with prices starting at 56,000 yuan and ending at 75,800 yuan. Despite being called the Grand Tiger throughout the series in export markets, in China, the Zhongxing Grand Tiger is only the name for the entry level model of the whole series.

Zhongxing Weihu G3
The updated Zhongxing Weihu G3 (威虎 G3) pickup truck was launched on the Chinese car market in June 2012 with prices starting at 61,800 yuan and ending at 99,800 yuan. The Weihu G3 is a more premium version of the standard Grand Tiger pickup truck, and sold alongside the entry level Zhongxing Grand Tiger in China. In foreign markets, the Zhongxing Grand Tiger G3 is the facelift version of the Zhongxing Grand Tiger.

Zhongxing Grand Tiger TUV (Zhongxing Weihu)

The Zhongxing Grand Tiger TUV or Zhongxing Weihu (威虎) pickup truck was launched on the Chinese car market in August 2013 with prices starting at 75,800 yuan and ending at 102,800 yuan. The Grand Tiger TUV is an even more premium version of the standard Grand Tiger pickup truck positioned above the Zhongxing Weihu G3. According to Zhongxing, TUV stands for Tiger Utility Vehicle.
The Zhongxing Grand Tiger TUV is available with two engine options from Isuzu including a 2.5 liter turbo diesel engine producing 143 hp and 340 nm of torque, and a 2.8 liter turbo diesel engine producing 95 hp and 225 nm of torque, both mated to a 5-speed manual gearbox.

References

External links

Zhongxing Grand Tiger G3
Zhongxing Grand Tiger TUV

Pickup trucks
All-wheel-drive vehicles
Four-wheel drive layout
2010s cars
Cars introduced in 2012
Trucks of China
Cars of China